Legend of Fragrance is a 2015 Chinese television series starring Li Yifeng, Tiffany Tang, William Chan and Shu Chang. It aired on Hunan TV from 4 February to 2 March 2015.

The series averaged a rating of 1.89% (CSM50) and was a hit in China.

Synopsis
A story about  the rivalry between two prominent families in the fragrance industry, which spawned birth secrets, revenge plots as well as the star-crossed love story of their children.

On the day of Ning Haotian (Ken Chang)'s marriage, his fiance Xiang Xueyin (Tang Yixin) eloped with his junior, An Qiusheng (Lv Xingyu). Lingying's lady-in-waiting, Su Yun (Zhang Na) impersonates her mistress and marries into the Ning family. She gives birth to a pair of twins, a son Ning Zhiyuan (Li Yifeng) who does not possess the sense of smell and daughter Ning Peishan. Xueyin gives birth to a baby girl named An Ruohuan (Tiffany Tang), who carries a unique scent on her body. She then died drinking poison to save husband.

An Qiusheng misunderstood and thought that Bai Songxian (Yang Mingna) had let his whereabouts be known to Ning Haotian, who had wanted to exact revenge on him for eloping with his fiance. He then abducted the Wen family's elder son Wen Shiqing, and changed his name to An Yichen (William Chan). After Songxian lost her son, she wanted to commit suicide, but met An Ruohuan, whom the Ning's housekeeper could not bear to kill. Songxian then decided to give up thoughts of suicide and adopted Ruohuan, changing her name to Le Yan. The few families then decided to use the "Fragrance of Lost Memory" on their children, to wipe out their memories.

Twelve years later, Yichen was tasked to investigate the case of missing young ladies in the Mo Wang province. In reality, he is under An Qiusheng's orders to seek revenge, taking the opportunity to destroy the Wen and Ning family. Yichen seeks help from his Japanese classmate, Xiaoya Huizi (Shu Chang). However, Huizi's father Tai Lang (Li Yaojing) schemes to steal the Chinese traditional artistic fragrance secrets, and plans to conquer Mo Wang Province. Meanwhile, Ruohuan infiltrates the Ning Family under An Yichen and An Shengqiu's plot to steal an invaluable perfume concoction recipe. There, she meets the spoilt young master Zhiyuan and the two often squabble. Zhiyuan eventually falls for the hardworking and sweet Ruo Huan, risking his life several times to save her.

Cast

Main

Supporting

Soundtrack

Ratings 

 Highest ratings are marked in red, lowest ratings are marked in blue

International broadcast
: Much TV, Next TV
: True4U

References

Chinese period television series
Chinese romance television series
2015 Chinese television series debuts
Hunan Television dramas
Television series by H&R Century Pictures